Tjalling van den Bosch (born 28 June 1958 in Achlum) or "Charlie" as he was often called, is a former competitive Dutch powerlifter, strongman, and Highland Games athlete. He competed only once in World's Strongest Man in 1990 finishing 7th, however, he was scheduled to compete in 1989 but had to withdraw due to an injury. Tjalling won the Strongest man of the Netherlands contest in 1989.

Tjalling studied psychology in Finland and has been training professional soccer players, speed skaters, track and field athletes and cyclists. His mental approach is also popular with companies, which have invited him to give inspirational talks. Tjalling is also a popular TV and movie personality in the Netherlands. He has appeared as a host on a game show for  years. His most famous movie being Bullseye! with Roger Moore and Michael Caine.

Tjalling was founder of an organization called Pure Strength, which held events in 1987-1990. Tjalling also loves to play a game that demands the most from his mind, Draughts, he even ranks in the top 100 in the world.

Records & Achievements
 World record holder car-pull, 1998 (pulled eighteen cars, mentioned in the Guinness Book of World Records)
 2 times World-Truck-Pull Champion (Petersborough 1989 & Birmingham 1991)
 Dutch Strongest Man
 Dutch Champion, Highland Games
 Holds several Dutch Strongmen and Highland games records.

References

1958 births
Living people
Dutch strength athletes
Dutch powerlifters
People from Franekeradeel
Sportspeople from Friesland